Kastellet (Danish: The Castle), a house in Roskilde, Denmark, is the former home of the Danish author and satirist Gustav Wied.

History
The house was built to Wied's own design in 1900 with the proceeds from Første Violin, a comedy published in 1898. After a visit, his friend and colleague Walter Christmas referred to the house as "Kastellet" due to its castle-like architecture, and Wied instantly adopted the name, always using it in reference to his home thereafter.

House and gardens
The property also includes a small half-timbered building known as the Widow Seat and an outbuilding known as the Gentlemen's Wing, connecting to a garden wall.

Both the buildings, the garden and a memorial grove with 28 memorials were listed by the Danish Heritage Agency in 1996.

See also
 L. A. Ring House

References

Listed buildings and structures in Roskilde Municipality
Houses in Roskilde Municipality
Houses completed in 1900
1900 establishments in Denmark